Memoirs of a Survivor is a 1981 British science fiction film directed by David Gladwell, with some scenes filmed at the location of Argyle Street, Norwich. It was screened in the Un Certain Regard section at the 1981 Cannes Film Festival. It is based on the 1974 novel of the same name by Doris Lessing.

Plot
After a near future economic collapse, England lies in ruins. Middle aged D (Julie Christie) struggles to survive in the failing city, where electricity is infrequent, water delivery scarce and trash pick up non-existent. As she rarely leaves her apartment, D takes in teenager Emily, allowing her to share D's apartment, in exchange for the girl's help.

Emily soon begins to fall for Gerald (Christopher Guard) and leaves D to move in with Gerald. Gerald operates a makeshift refugee camp for the orphan and homeless children of the city. D is able to see Gerald's failing whereas Emily can not.

In addition. D's grasp on reality is questioned as she can also travel back in time and observe a Victorian age family that resided in the same apartment.  D may be witnessing the distorted history of the young woman currently in her care, as the child in the Victorian age is also named Emily, although whether these trips to the past are actually occurring or they are a fantasy is the mind of D a question left unanswered.

Cast
 Julie Christie as D
 Christopher Guard as Gerald
 Leonie Mellinger as Emily Mary Cartwright
 Debbie Hutchings as June
 Nigel Hawthorne as Victorian Father
 Pat Keen as Victorian Mother
 Georgina Griffiths as Victorian Emily
 Christopher Tsangarides as Victorian Son
 Mark Dignam as Newsvendor
 Alison Dowling as Janet White
 John Franklyn-Robbins as Prof. White
 Rowena Cooper as Mrs. White
 Barbara Hicks as Woman on Waste Ground
 John Comer as Man Delivering Emily
 Adrienne Byrne as Maureen

Reception
Variety praised the performance of Christie, but stated that the low budget hampered the portrayal of the degenerating city. Christie won a Fantasporto International Fantasy Film Award for Best Actress for her performance. Experiential Conversations states that the movie takes an impressionistic approach to the material of the novel, stating that Christie is able to carry this curious and haunting film. However, they state that the viewer must abandon trying to comprehend the literal meaning of the Victorian sequences, and instead accept the film on the whole as an immensely atmospheric mood piece. Moria state that this was what "one might kindly call a flawed film " It praised the visuals of the film as well as the ending and a brooding scene.

References

External links

1981 films
1980s science fiction films
British science fiction films
Films directed by David Gladwell
Films based on British novels
1980s English-language films
1980s British films